Kalisarar Dam, is an earthfill and gravity dam on Kalisarar river near Salekasa, Gondia district in the state of Maharashtra in India.

Specifications

Purpose
 Irrigation

See also
 Dams in Maharashtra
 List of reservoirs and dams in India

References

Dams in Gondia district
Dams completed in 1988
1988 establishments in Maharashtra